Simpson Branch is a stream in Washington County in the U.S. state of Missouri. It is a tributary of Mineral Fork.

Simpson Branch has the name of the local Simpson family.

See also
List of rivers of Missouri

References

Rivers of Washington County, Missouri
Rivers of Missouri